The 1985 NCAA Division III Men's Lacrosse Championship was the sixth annual tournament to determine the national champions of NCAA Division III men's college lacrosse in the United States.

The tournament field included eight teams, with the final played at Kibler Field at Washington College in Chestertown, Maryland. 

In a rematch of the previous year's championship game, five-time defending champions Hobart defeated hosts Washington College in the final, 15–8, to win their sixth Division III national title.

Bracket

See also
1985 NCAA Division I Men's Lacrosse Championship
1985 NCAA Division III Women's Lacrosse Championship (inaugural edition)

References

NCAA Division III Men's Lacrosse Championship
NCAA Division III Men's Lacrosse Championship
NCAA Division III Men's Lacrosse